Josina ("Josien") Alida Elzerman (born 2 April 1956) is a former freestyle and breaststroke swimmer from the Netherlands, who competed for her native country at the 1972 Summer Olympics. There she was eliminated in the qualifying heats of the 200 m breaststroke, clocking 2:28.18, and finished in fifth place in the 4×100 m freestyle relay. Both her brothers Hans and Henk were Olympic swimmers.

References

1956 births
Living people
Dutch female breaststroke swimmers
Dutch female freestyle swimmers
Olympic swimmers of the Netherlands
Swimmers at the 1972 Summer Olympics
Swimmers from The Hague
20th-century Dutch women